Færder National Park is a national park in Nøtterøy and Tjøme in Vestfold, Norway. It is mostly a marine park, and includes some islands and coastal areas. To the east, the national park borders to the Ytre Hvaler National Park. The park was established on 23 August 2013. The park includes large parts of the archipelago of Bolærne, as well as the protected Færder Lighthouse and the ruins of Store Færder Lighthouse with its associated protected buildings.

Gallery

References

National parks of Norway
Protected areas established in 2013
2013 establishments in Norway
Nøtterøy
Tjøme